Ahmed Rashed Sultan Al-Khabail Al-Mehrzi (Arabic:أحمد راشد) (born 19 January 1997) is an Emirati footballer. He currently plays as a left back for Al-Wahda.

External links

References

Emirati footballers
1997 births
Living people
Al Wahda FC players
Place of birth missing (living people)
UAE Pro League players
Association football defenders
Footballers at the 2018 Asian Games
Asian Games bronze medalists for the United Arab Emirates
Asian Games medalists in football
Medalists at the 2018 Asian Games